Browns Valley is an unincorporated community in Brown Township, Montgomery County, in the U.S. state of Indiana.

History
Browns Valley was originally known as Brownsville, and under the latter name was platted in 1836 by Matthias VanCleave. The community was named after its location in Brown Township. A post office was established at Browns Valley in 1850, and remained in operation until it was discontinued in 1945.

Geography

References

Unincorporated communities in Montgomery County, Indiana
Unincorporated communities in Indiana